Jean-Philippe Tanguy (born 25 March 1986) is a French politician who has represented the 4th constituency of the Somme department in the National Assembly since 2022. He is a member of the National Rally (RN).

Biography

Early life and education
Tanguy was born in  1986 in Boulogne-sur-Mer. Her mother is a secretary and her father is an industrial site manager.

He began studies at the École spéciale militaire de Saint-Cyr military academy but dropped out and studied degrees at ESSEC Business School and Sciences Po in Paris. He then worked as a specialist in the industrial and energy sectors.

Political career
Tanguy joined Debout la France and unsuccessfully contested for the party during the 2015 regional elections in Nord-Pas-de-Calais-Picardie. He worked on Nicolas Dupont-Aignan's campaign during the 2017 French presidential election and according to Mediapart tried to forge an alliance between Dupont-Aignan and Marine Le Pen.

He joined the National Rally in 2020 and during the 2022 French presidential election was a deputy campaign manager for Marine Le Pen. For the 2022 French legislative election he contested Somme's 4th constituency and defeated outgoing deputy Jean-Claude Leclabart.

References

1986 births
Living people
National Rally (France) politicians
21st-century French politicians
Deputies of the 16th National Assembly of the French Fifth Republic
21st-century French lawyers
Sciences Po alumni
Debout la France politicians
People from Boulogne-sur-Mer